Streptomyces cavourensis is a bacterium species from the genus of Streptomyces which has been isolated from soil in Italy. Streptomyces cavourensis produces flavensomycin.

Further reading

See also 
 List of Streptomyces species

References

External links
Type strain of Streptomyces cavourensis at BacDive -  the Bacterial Diversity Metadatabase

cavourensis
Bacteria described in 1978